Yevhen Anatoliiovych Aranovskyi (Ukrainian: Євгеній Анатолійович Арановський, born 13 October 1976 in Kyiv, Ukraine) is a Ukrainian professional football referee. He has been a full international for FIFA since 2011.

References

External links

1976 births
Living people
Sportspeople from Kyiv
Ukrainian football referees